Chants d'épuration is a 2003 album by Canadian songwriter Plume Latraverse.

Track listing
Le lapin reproducteur
Angélatine
Érosion éolienne (...et chapeau moral)
Le kayak rouge
Écholalie (qu'est-ce qui?)
Blouse d'automne
Le vaste monde (la vie nous rattrape)
Beau filon!
Turlupinades
L'intolérable intolérant
La traversée du dessert
Sans nommer d'nom
Épuration extrème
Black out! (sans queue ni tête)
Méli-mélopée
Aquarelle
Le coeur de l'action
featuring Louise Forestier on vocals

2003 albums
Plume Latraverse albums